Bhedarganj is an upazila (sub-district) of Shariatpur District in central Bangladesh, located in the Dhaka Division. It is a part of the Greater Faridpur region and is named after its administrative centre, the town of Bhedarganj.

Geography
About seven-tenths is land and three-tenths is water, chiefly the Padma River, which cuts through the northern part of the upazila. It borders Naria Upazila to the west and north, Munshiganj District to the north, Chandpur District to the north and east, Gosairhat and Damudya upazilas to the south, and Shariatpur Sadar Upazila to the west. The Meghna River also flows through this upazila as well as the Banglabazar Canal.

History
In 1924, the Zamindar of Bikrampur Syed Bhedar Uddin Shah established the Bhedarganj Thana in his name.

During the Bangladesh Liberation War of 1971, two brawls and a battle took place in Bhedarganj resulting in the deaths of many Bengali freedom fighters. The thana was converted into an upazila on 14 September 1983 and inaugurated by Sultan Mahmud.

Demographics

According to the 2011 Bangladesh census, Bhedarganj Upazila had 53,305 households and a population of 253,234, 3.6% of whom lived in urban areas. 12.0% of the population was under the age of 5. The literacy rate (age 7 and over) was 42.7%, compared to the national average of 51.8%.

Administration
Bhedarganj Upazila is divided into Bhedarganj Municipality and 13 union parishads: Arshi Nagar, Char Bhaga, Char Census, Char Kumaria, Chhaygaon, Dhakhin Tarabunia, D m khali , Kachikata, Mahisar, Naryanpur, Rambhadrapur, Sakhipur, and Tarabunia. The union parishads are subdivided into 87 mauzas and 372 villages.

Vice Chairman : Mannan Bepary

Woman Vice Chairman : Lipi Sorder

Upazila Nirbahi Officer (UNO) : Abdullah Al Mamun

Bhedarganj Municipality was established in 1997.  It is subdivided into 9 wards and 12 mahallas.

Upazila Chairmen

Economy and tourism
Bhedarganj mainly exports jute.

Notable places of interest in Bhedarganj include the Upazila Jame Mosque and the Kartikpur Zarina Trust Mosque, among the total 450 mosques in the upazila. The zamindar palace of Chhaygaon and the Anandabazar Embankment are also popular sites.

Education

There are four colleges & a university in the upazila. They include Hazi Shariat Ullah College and M. A Reza Degree College. The only university of the district named Z.H. Sikder University of Science and Technology is situated here in this upazila.

The madrasa education system includes one fazil madrasa.

Notable people
AKM Enamul Haque Shamim, Deputy Minister of Water Resources
Parveen Haque Sikder, director of National Bank Limited
Shamim Sikder, sculptor
Siraj Sikder, revolutionary

See also
Upazilas of Bangladesh
Districts of Bangladesh
Divisions of Bangladesh

References

Bhedarganj Upazila
Upazilas of Shariatpur District